The men's 100m freestyle events at the 2020 World Para Swimming European Open Championships were held at the Penteada Olympic Pools Complex.

Medalists

Results

S4
Final

S5
Heat 1

Final

S6
Heats

Final

S7
Heat 1

Final

S8
Heats

Final

S9
Heats

Final

S10
Heats

Final

S11
Heats

Final

S12
Heats

Final

S13
Heats

Final

S14
Heats

Final

References

2020 World Para Swimming European Championships